The name Australia (pronounced  in Australian English) is derived from the Latin australis, meaning "southern", and specifically from the hypothetical Terra Australis postulated in pre-modern geography. The name was popularised by the explorer Matthew Flinders from 1804, and it has been in official use since 1817, replacing "New Holland,"  an English translation of the Dutch name, first given by Abel Tasman in 1643 as the name for the continent.

History
The name Australia has been applied to two continents. Originally, it was applied to the south polar continent, or sixth continent, now known as Antarctica. The name is a shortened form of Terra Australis which was one of the names given to the imagined (but undiscovered) land mass that was thought to surround the south pole. The earliest known use of the name Australia in Latin was in 1545, when the word appears in a woodcut illustration of the globe titled "Sphere of the Winds" contained in an astrological textbook published in Frankfurt.  In the nineteenth century, the name Australia was re-assigned to New Holland, the fifth continent. Thereafter, the south polar continent remained nameless for some eighty years until the new name of Antarctica was invented.

A Terra Australis "land of the south" appeared on world maps from the 15th century, although it was not based on any actual surveying of such a landmass but rather on the hypothesis that continents in the Northern Hemisphere should be balanced by land in the south. This theory of balancing land is on record as early as the 5th century on maps by Macrobius.

The earliest recorded use of the word Australia in English was in 1625 in "A note of Australia del Espíritu Santo, written by Sir Richard Hakluyt", published by Samuel Purchas in Hakluytus Posthumus, a variation of the original Spanish name "Austrialia del Espiritu Santo" (Southern-Austrian Land of the Holy Spirit) coined by navigator Pedro Fernandes de Queirós in 1606 for the largest island of Vanuatu, believing his expedition had reached Terra Australis. This is a rare combination of terms "Austral" and "Austria", the latter in honour of the Habsburg dynasty that ruled Spain at the time. The Dutch adjectival form Australische was used in a Dutch book in Batavia (Jakarta) in 1638, to refer to the newly discovered lands to the south. Australia was later used in a 1693 translation of Les Aventures de Jacques Sadeur dans la Découverte et le Voyage de la Terre Australe, a 1676 French novel by Gabriel de Foigny, under the pen-name Jacques Sadeur.  Referring to the entire South Pacific region, Alexander Dalrymple used it in An Historical Collection of Voyages and Discoveries in the South Pacific Ocean in 1771.

The name Australia was specifically applied to the continent for the first time in 1794, with the botanists George Shaw and Sir James Smith writing of "the vast island, or rather continent, of 
Australia, Australasia or New Holland" in their 1793 Zoology and Botany of New Holland, and James Wilson including it on a 1799 chart.

The name Australia was popularised by the explorer Matthew Flinders, who pushed for it to be formally adopted as early as 1804. When preparing his manuscript and charts for his 1814 A Voyage to Terra Australis, he was persuaded by his patron, Sir Joseph Banks, to use the term Terra Australis as this was the name most familiar to the public. Flinders did so, and published the following rationale:

In the footnote to this Flinders wrote:
 This is the only occurrence of the word Australia in that text; but in Appendix III, Robert Brown's General remarks, geographical and systematical, on the botany of Terra Australis, Brown makes use of the adjectival form Australian throughout,—the first known use of that form. Despite popular conception, the book was not instrumental in the adoption of the name: the name came gradually to be accepted over the following ten years.

The first time that the name Australia appears to have been officially used was in a despatch to Lord Bathurst of 4 April 1817 in which Governor Lachlan Macquarie acknowledges the receipt of Capt. Flinders' charts of Australia. On 12 December 1817, Macquarie recommended to the Colonial Office that it be formally adopted. In 1824, the Admiralty agreed that the continent should be known officially as Australia.

Ulimaroa was a name given to Australia by the Swedish geographer and cartographer Daniel Djurberg in 1776. Djurberg adapted the name from Olhemaroa, a Maori word found in Hawkesworth's edition of Captain James Cook and Sir Joseph Banks' journals which is thought to have been a misunderstood translation  the Maori were actually referring to Grand Terre, the largest island of New Caledonia. Djurberg believed the name meant something like "big red land", whereas modern linguists believe it meant "long hand"  echoing the geography of Grand Terre. The spurious name continued to be reproduced on certain European maps, particularly some Austrian, Czech, German and Swedish maps, until around 1820, including in Carl Almqvist's 1817 novel Parjumouf Saga ifrån Nya Holland (Stockholm, 1817).

Commonwealth of Australia
The sovereign country Australia, formed in 1901 by the Federation of the six British colonies, is officially known as the Commonwealth of Australia, abbreviated within the Commonwealth of Australia Constitution Act and the Constitution of Australia to "the Commonwealth".

Oz
The country has been referred to colloquially as Oz by people outside the country since the early 20th century; and by Australians in more recent times.

The Oxford English Dictionary records a first occurrence in 1908, in the form Oss. Oz is often taken as an oblique reference to the fictional Land of Oz in the film The Wizard of Oz (1939), based on L. Frank Baum's novel The Wonderful Wizard of Oz (1900). In 1988, an American opinion was that Australians' "image of Australia as a 'Land of Oz' is not new, and dedication to it runs deep" but evidence for this view within Australia itself is lacking. The spelling Oz is likely to have been influenced by the 1939 film, though the pronunciation was probably always with a /z/, as it is also for Aussie, sometimes spelt Ozzie. The Baz Luhrmann film Australia (2008) makes repeated reference to The Wizard of Oz, which appeared just before the wartime action of Australia. Some critics have even speculated that Baum was inspired by Australia, in naming the Land of Oz: "In Ozma of Oz (1907), Dorothy gets back to Oz as the result of a storm at sea while she and Uncle Henry are travelling by ship to Australia. So, like Australia, Oz is somewhere to the west of California. Like Australia, Oz is an island continent. Like Australia, Oz has inhabited regions bordering on a great desert. One might almost imagine that Baum intended Oz to be Australia, or perhaps a magical land in the center of the great Australian desert."

Other epithets and nicknames
Australia is colloquially known as "the Land Down Under" (or just "Down Under"), which derives from the country's position in the Southern Hemisphere, at the antipodes of the United Kingdom. The term was first recorded in print in 1886, and was popularised internationally by the 1980 song of the same name by Men at Work. Other less common nicknames include "Straya" ("Australia" pronounced in an exaggerated Strine manner), and "Aussie", which is usually used as a demonym, but occasionally extended to the country as a whole (especially in New Zealand). More poetic epithets used within Australia include "the Great Southern Land" (re-popularised by a 1980s rock song, and not to be confused with the Great Southern region of Western Australia), "the Lucky Country" (deriving from Donald Horne's 1964 book of the same name), and two phrases deriving from Dorothea Mackellar's 1908 poem "My Country" – "the sunburnt country" and "the wide brown land".

References

Australia
Name